Bărăgan may refer to:
Bărăgan deportations, a large-scale action of penal transportation by the Romanian communist regime
Bărăgan Plain, a steppe plain in south-eastern Romania
Costică Bărăgan (born 1949), Romanian fencer
The Thistles of the Baragan, a 1958 Franco-Romanian film